Clastoptera arizonana, the Arizona spittlebug, is a species of spittlebug in the family Clastopteridae. It is found in North America.

References

External links

 

Articles created by Qbugbot
Insects described in 1928
Clastopteridae